Garble may refer to:
 Garble (My Little Pony), a character in My Little Pony
 Garble, a character in Freddy and the Men from Mars

See also
 Grable, a surname (and list of people with the name)